Tesco Bank is a British retail bank which was formed in July 1997 (as Tesco Personal Finance), and which has been wholly owned by Tesco plc since 2008. The bank was formed as part of a 50:50 joint venture between The Royal Bank of Scotland and Tesco, the largest supermarket in the United Kingdom.

Tesco later acquired Royal Bank of Scotland shareholding, which resulted in the bank becoming a wholly owned subsidiary, and now operates under its own banking licence under the Financial Services Compensation Scheme. The bank offers a range of insurance, credit cards, loans, savings, mortgages and travel products. Tesco Bank also launched a current account in June 2014, but has since stopped accepting new current account applications, and all existing current accounts were closed in November 2021.

A unique selling point of Tesco's banking products is that the bank is able to leverage its large customer base to cross-sell financial services products, as customers can accumulate Tesco Clubcard points when they purchase finance products. Tesco Bank came third in the British Bank Awards (2016), with an average customer satisfaction of 87.8%.

History 
Prior to the formation of Tesco Personal Finance plc, Tesco had a banking joint venture with NatWest, which ended in February 1997. TPF was formed in July 1997, following the successful launch of Sainsbury's Bank by its main competitor, Sainsbury's. The bank was launched as a joint venture with the Royal Bank of Scotland, which processed all its financial transactions.

Subsidiary companies of the Royal Bank, such as Direct Line, UKI and Lombard Direct helped Tesco Personal Finance provide insurance products. In July 2008, Tesco announced that they were buying out the Royal Bank of Scotland's 50% stake in the company for £950 million, and the transaction was completed later that year. In October 2009, Tesco Personal Finance was renamed Tesco Bank.

Services 
Tesco Bank provides a range of personal accounts, including credit cards, loans, savings accounts, insurance and foreign currency exchange. Mortgages were added in August 2012, after briefly offering products provided by First Active in November 2004. The bank confirmed in December 2013 that it planned to launch a current account, and the first account was launched on 10 June 2014. Tesco Bank launched its first mobile app in 2014, supporting its core transactional products (Current and Savings accounts as well as Credit cards).  In subsequent years it launched a number of innovative features including “balance peek” in 2015 and was the first bank in the world to deploy an app for Apple Watch at its launch in 2015.

Tesco Bank sold its mortgage portfolio to Lloyds Banking Group in September 2019, and in February 2020, the bank also decided to stop offering current accounts to new customers. On 26 July 2021, Tesco Bank announced it will be closing all current accounts held by its customers, citing "limited activity".

Locations 
The bank is registered in Scotland at 2 South Gyle Crescent, Edinburgh EH12 9FQ. While operating as a joint venture, the bank shared its registered office with RBS at St Andrew Square, Edinburgh. In July 2010, Tesco Bank opened two major offices at Quorum Business Park in Newcastle, and a larger one at Broadway One in Glasgow. Since then, there has also been an office opened in South Gyle, Edinburgh.

During March 2009, Tesco initiated a plan to roll out in store branches, under the Tesco Bank branding. On 14 May 2016, Tesco Bank closed all three remaining branches, with a focus on being a completely online bank.

In addition, there are over three hundred Tesco Travel Money Bureaux, an in store bureau de change, managed by a joint venture with Travelex.

Fraud incident 2016 
On 6 November 2016, British newspapers reported that customers of Tesco Bank were reporting that hundreds or in some cases thousands of pounds had been lost from their accounts, with some reporting unauthorised card transactions originating in Brazil. The following day, the bank suspended online transactions, and made a statement saying up to 40,000 customers had been affected.

Shares in the retails group fell 3% on the news. On Tuesday 8 November, the chief executive of the UK Financial Conduct Authority was asked for a summary of the issue by a Parliamentary committee, and said of the attack that "There are elements of this that look unprecedented and it is serious, clearly". The bank declared that the cyber attack resulted in the loss of £2.5m. Later, United Kingdom's Financial Conduct Authority asked the bank to pay £16.4m as the penalty.

References

External links 

 

Tesco
Banks of Scotland
Banks of the United Kingdom
Companies based in Edinburgh
British companies established in 1997
Banks established in 1997
Royal Bank of Scotland
Supermarket banks
1997 establishments in Scotland